Conservative Party leadership election  may refer to:

Canada
Progressive Conservative Associations
 Progressive Conservative Association of Alberta leadership elections
 Progressive Conservative Association of Nova Scotia leadership elections
Progressive Conservative Party

 1927 Conservative leadership convention
 1938 National Conservative leadership convention
 1942 Progressive Conservative leadership convention
 1948 Progressive Conservative leadership convention
 1956 Progressive Conservative leadership convention
 1995 Progressive Conservative leadership convention
 1967 Progressive Conservative leadership election
 1976 Progressive Conservative leadership election
 1983 Progressive Conservative leadership election
 1993 Progressive Conservative leadership election
 1998 Progressive Conservative leadership election
 2003 Progressive Conservative leadership election
Progressive Conservative Party Branches
 Progressive Conservative Party of Saskatchewan leadership elections
 Progressive Conservative Party of Manitoba leadership elections
 Progressive Conservative Party of New Brunswick leadership elections
 Progressive Conservative Party of Newfoundland and Labrador leadership elections
 Progressive Conservative Party of Ontario leadership elections
 Progressive Conservative Party of Prince Edward Island leadership elections
Conservative Party of Canada

 2004 Conservative Party of Canada leadership election
 2017 Conservative Party of Canada leadership election
 2020 Conservative Party of Canada leadership election
 2022 Conservative Party of Canada leadership election

Quebec
 Conservative Party of Quebec (historical) leadership elections

United Kingdom
 1965 Conservative Party leadership election
 1975 Conservative Party leadership election
 1989 Conservative Party leadership election
 1990 Conservative Party leadership election
 1995 Conservative Party leadership election
 1997 Conservative Party leadership election
 2001 Conservative Party leadership election
 2003 Conservative Party leadership election
 2005 Conservative Party leadership election
 2016 Conservative Party leadership election
 2019 Conservative Party leadership election
 July–September 2022 Conservative Party leadership election
 October 2022 Conservative Party leadership election

Scotland
 1998 Scottish Conservative Party leadership election
 2005 Scottish Conservative Party leadership election
 2011 Scottish Conservative Party leadership election

Wales
 2011 Welsh Conservatives leadership election
 2018 Welsh Conservatives leadership election
 2021 Welsh Conservatives leadership election

See also
 
 Conservative government